Yukiko Ikeda (born 15 July 1971) is a Japanese archer. She competed in the women's individual and team events at the 1992 Summer Olympics.

References

1971 births
Living people
Japanese female archers
Olympic archers of Japan
Archers at the 1992 Summer Olympics
Place of birth missing (living people)
20th-century Japanese women